Stuart Scharf (1941 – November 8, 2007) was an American composer, guitarist, and record producer.

Scharf grew up in Crown Heights and attended Winthrop Junior High School. Scharf graduated, with honors, from CCNY in 1962 (mathematics major).

He was a friend of guitarist Jay Berliner, who influenced his career. In the early 1960s, Scharf was lead guitarist for folk-singer Leon Bibb. He also worked with arranger Walter Raim and folk-singer Judy Collins as well as bassist Bill Lee (father of Spike Lee). For several years he partnered with Martin Gersten, chief engineer of WNCN, in a recording studio at 18 Jones Street in Greenwich Village. They shared this space with folk music broadcaster Skip Weshner.

Scharf was a prolific studio musician in New York City in the 1960s, playing guitar with Chad Mitchell, Janis Ian, Al Kooper, and Carly Simon. He also had a producing partnership with Bob Dorough for many years, and together they produced albums by Spanky and Our Gang. Scharf was the composer of Spanky and Our Gang's hit "Like to Get to Know You." In 1980, he moved to Hamilton Township, Monroe County, Pennsylvania, where he continued his recording business.

Discography

As sideman
With Charles Earland
Charles III (Prestige, 1973)
With J. J. Johnson and Kai Winding
Betwixt & Between (A&M/CTI, 1969)
With Al Kooper
You Never Know Who Your Friends Are (Columbia, 1969)
Easy Does It (Columbia, 1970)
Naked Songs (Columbia, 1973)
With Hubert Laws
The Rite of Spring (CTI, 1971)
With Pearls Before Swine
Beautiful Lies You Could Live In (Reprise, 1971)
With Phil Woods
Greek Cooking (Impulse!, 1967)

As producer
With Spanky and Our Gang
Like to Get to Know You (Mercury, 1968)
"Anything You Choose b/w Without Rhyme or Reason" (Mercury, 1969) wrote 6 songs for this album, including the politically-significant 'Give a Damn', which was adopted as a theme song by the New York Urban Coalition, and by New York Mayor John Lindsay during his 1969 re-election campaign.

Notes

American jazz composers
American jazz guitarists
People from Monroe County, Pennsylvania
Guitarists from Pennsylvania
1941 births
2007 deaths
Plastic Ono Band members
Guitarists from New York City
20th-century American guitarists
Jazz musicians from New York (state)
Jazz musicians from Pennsylvania
American male guitarists
American male jazz composers
People from Crown Heights, Brooklyn
City College of New York alumni
20th-century jazz composers
20th-century American male musicians